Scarpitta is a surname. Notable people with the surname include:

Carmen Scarpitta (1933–2008), Italian actress
Salvatore Scarpitta (1919–2007), American artist